Kuku Mathur Ki Jhand Ho Gayi  is a 2014 Indian Hindi-language romantic comedy-drama film directed by Aman Sachdeva and produced by Ekta Kapoor and Bejoy Nambiar. The film stars Siddharth Gupta, who plays the titular role.

Cast
 Siddharth Gupta as Kuku Mathur
 Simran Kaur Mundi as Mitali
 Pallavi Batra as Rosy
 Brijendra Kala as Babaji
 Ashish Juneja as Ronnie
 Sidharth Bhardwaj as Himanshu
 Amit Sial as Prabhakar sala
 Mohit Sinha as Student (BABAJI)
 Kumar Anuj Sharma as Yogesh
 Raj Singh Arora
 Tanvi Kishore as Sunaina
 Rajshree Seem as Ronnie's Mother
Roopa Ganguly as Suresh's wife
Neha Ahuja as Chhota

Production
After much discussion Ekta Kapoor finalized that the film's title would be as quirky as the concept of the film and it was titled Kuku Mathur Ki Jhand Ho Gayi.The film's quirky title has been chosen through a survey by the youth of Delhi. While deciding on its title, the makers took inputs from Delhi students from various colleges.
"We zeroed in on the word "jhand", which is very popular in the city. The word describes the hilarious crisis situation that the actor is in,"  Bejoy Nambiar said in a statement.

Controversy

A resident of Bhopal, NL Mathur has filed a Public Interest Litigation (PIL) against Balaji Motion Pictures, claiming that the film's title has hurt sentiments of the Kayastha community. In his petition, Mathur claims that the word "Jhand" is derogatory and it will hurt the sentiments of Mathurs from the Kayastha community. Further the complainant has also asked the filmmakers to change name of the film or remove the offensive word from the title. However, Tanuj Garg, CEO of Balaji Motion Pictures, states that they have received no such PIL, further adding that the film's title relates to normal and standard nomenclature used in the country.

References

External links
 
 

2010s Hindi-language films
2014 films
Balaji Motion Pictures films